Saeid Malekan (born 2 April 1979) is an Iranian producer, makeup designer and director.

Filmography

Film

Film

Home Video

Television

Awards 

|-
| 2018
| The Lost Strait
| rowspan="7" | Crystal Simorgh for Best Makeup Artist at the Fajr Film Festival
| rowspan="7" 
|-
| 2016
| Life and a Day
|-
| 2011
| Alzheimer's
|-
| 2011
| Mother's Day
|-
| 2010
| The Kingdom of Solomon
|-
| 2009
| When We All Sleep
|-
| 2008
| The Song of Sparrows

References

External links 

One film alone cannot tell the vast story of “The Lost Strait”: director
Persian Wikipedia
My Brother Khosrow
filmografie 
saeid-malekan
moviebuff
Saeid Malekan
Filmography
SAEID MALEKAN FILMOGRAPHY 
War movie “The Lost Strait” named best at Fajr festival

 

1979 births
Living people
Producers who won the Best Film Crystal Simorgh
Producers who won the Audience Choice of Best Film Crystal Simorgh